Ariel Augusto Nogueira (born 22 February 1910, date of death unknown) was Brazilian football player. He has played for Brazil national team.

References

External links

1910 births
Year of death missing
People from Petrópolis
Brazilian footballers
Brazil international footballers
1934 FIFA World Cup players
Botafogo de Futebol e Regatas players
Association football defenders
Sportspeople from Rio de Janeiro (state)